Bağözü can refer to:

 Bağözü, Beypazarı
 Bağözü, Gercüş
 Bağözü, Kargı
 Bağözü, Kozan